Bourdin is a French surname. Notable people with the surname include:

Françoise Bourdin (born 1952), French author
Frédéric Bourdin (born 1974), French impostor
Gilbert Bourdin (1924–1998), founder of Aumism
Guy Bourdin (1928–1991), French artist and photographer
Jacques Bourdin (died 1567), French diplomat
Jean-Jacques Bourdin (born 1949), French journalist and television presenter
Joël Bourdin (born 1938), French politician
Lise Bourdin (born 1925), French actress
Martial Bourdin (1868–1894), French anarchist
Pierre Bourdin (born 1944), French footballer
Roger Bourdin (1900–1973), French baritone
Thierry Bourdin (born 1962), French wrestler

See also 
 Bourdain